Elger Esser (born 11 May 1967) is a German landscape photographer, living in Düsseldorf. "He is primarily associated with large-format images of European lowlands with his characteristic low horizon lines, pale luminous colours and vast skies".

Esser's work is held in many public collections such as the Rijksmuseum in Amsterdam and the Solomon R. Guggenheim Museum, Metropolitan Museum of Art and Museum of Modern Art in New York. He has won the Rheinischer Kunstpreis and the Oskar Schlemmer Prize.

Life and work
Esser was born in Stuttgart, Germany and grew up in Rome.

In 1986, he moved to Düsseldorf, where he worked as a commercial photographer until 1991. He attended the Kunstakademie Düsseldorf between 1991 and 1997, where he studied under Bernd Becher. From 1996 he was a  there.

From 2006 to 2009 Esser was professor of photography at Karlsruhe University of Arts and Design.

He is influenced by Romantic paintings and 19th-century photography, and inspired by Gustave Flaubert, Marcel Proust and Guy de Maupassant. He seeks out beauty.

Esser's photographs of European rivers or river banks are large, quiet and deserted. Most of the time the horizon is low, as in the Dutch landscape paintings of the 17th century.

'Morgenland' is an old German term for the Middle East, meaning 'morning land'. For Morgenland (2017), he travelled to Lebanon, Israel and Egypt (including along the Nile to Luxor and Aswan) between 2004 and 2015. Using an 8×10 large format camera he made "luminous and unpeopled landscapes" with "glassy waters, still horizons[,] ancient ruins", shorelines, traditional feluccas and dahabeah sailing boats that "show off the area's mysticism, away from headlines about war and violence."

Publications

Books of work by Esser
Posed Spaces. Edited by Kulturforum Alte Post Neuss. With a text by Kerstin Stremmel.
Veduten und Landschaften. With a text by Rupert Pfab. Siegen: Kunstverein Siegen, 1998.
Vedutas and Landscapes 1996–2000. Munich: Schirmer/Mosel, 2000. . With a text by Rupert Pfab and a conversation between Esser and Georg Elben.
Nach Italien = To Italy. Heidelberg, Germany: Kehrer, 2000. Photographs by Esser and texts by Manfred Esser and Elger Esser. Edited by Thomas Schirmböck. .
Marne + Loire. Bologna: Pendragon, 2001. Edited by Galleria d'Arte Moderna, Villa delle Rose, Bologna.
Olivo Barbieri – Elger Esser: Cityscapes / Landscapes. Cinisello Balsamo, Milan: Silvana 2002. Edited by Palazzo delle Papesse Centro Arte Contemporanea, Siena.
Cap d'Antifer—Étretat. Munich: Schirmer/Mosel, 2002. . With excerpts from correspondence between Gustave Flaubert and Guy de Maupassant (1877) and an essay by Peter Foos.
Elger Esser & Bae, Bien-U. Seoul: Gana Art Center, 2006.
Ansichten/Views/Vues: Bilder aus dem Archiv. Munich: Schirmer/Mosel, 2008. . With a text by Alexander Pühringer.
Eigenzeit = Proper Time. Munich: Schirmer/Mosel, 2009. Edited by Kunstmuseum Stuttgart. .
Wrecks. Düsseldorf: self-published, 2009.
Nocturnes à Giverny Munich: Schirmer/Mosel, 2012. .
Zeitigen.  Munich: Schirmer/Mosel, 2016. Edited by Pia Müller-Tamm/Staatliche Kunsthalle Karlsruhe.
Combray. Munich: Schirmer/Mosel, 2016. .
Morgenland. Munich: Schirmer/Mosel, 2017. .

Publications with contributions by Esser
The Düsseldorf School of Photography. New York: Aperture, 2010. Germany: Schirmer/Mosel, 2010. Edited by Stefan Gronert. Includes work by Bernd and Hilla Becher, Laurenz Berges, Esser, Andreas Gursky, Candida Höfer, Axel Hütte, Simone Nieweg, Thomas Ruff, Jörg Sasse, Thomas Struth, and Petra Wunderlich; a foreword by Lothar Schirmer, an essay by Gronert, and summary biographies, exhibition lists and bibliographies for each of the photographers. .

Awards
2010: . A €20,000 prize.
2016: Oskar Schlemmer Prize. A €25,000 prize.

Collections
Esser's work is held in the following public collections:
Albright–Knox Art Gallery, Buffalo, New York
Brooklyn Museum, Brooklyn, New York: 1 print (as of December 2020)
Centre Pompidou, Paris: 1 print (as of December 2020)
The Frances Young Tang Teaching Museum and Art Gallery, Skidmore College, Saratoga Springs, New York: 1 print (as of December 2020)
Huis Marseille, Museum for Photography, Amsterdam: 1 print (as of December 2020)
Metropolitan Museum of Art, New York: 1 print (as of December 2020)
Mumok, Vienna, Austria: 1 print (as of December 2020)
Museum der Moderne Salzburg, Salzburg, Austria
Museum of Modern Art, New York: 1 print (as of December 2020)
Rheinisches Landesmuseum Bonn, Bonn, Germany
Rijksmuseum, Amsterdam: 11 prints (as of December 2020)
Solomon R. Guggenheim Museum, New York: 1 print (as of December 2020)
Stedelijk Museum Amsterdam, Amsterdam: 1 print (as of December 2020)

References

External links

Esser talking about his work for Paris Photo in 2018 (video)

Landscape photographers
20th-century German photographers
21st-century German photographers
Kunstakademie Düsseldorf alumni
Artists from Stuttgart
Living people
1967 births